Shadows of the Bunghole is the second studio album released by The great Luke Ski under the name "Luke Ski's Psycho Potpourri" in 1997.  This album has been out of print since 2003, and many tracks have since been re-released on later compilation collections.  Some tracks were re-recorded for later studio albums, as some of the original recordings used karaoke tracks of the songs parodied as backing music, and backing vocals of the original lyrics were sometimes audible through the parody vocals.

Track listing
"The Doctor And William" - 4:26
Parody of "Rhymin' and Stealin'" by the Beastie Boys
A song about Dr. Demento and Whimsical Will
"Resistance" - 3:00
Parody of "The Distance" by Cake
A song about the events of Star Trek: First Contact
"The Great Cornholio" - 1:55
Parody of "Macarena" by Los Del Rio
A song about Cornholio, the hyperactive alter-ego of Beavis from Beavis and Butt-head
"Humpa Hound" - 3:39
Parody of "Jump Around" by House of Pain
A song about Luke himself and his friends
"Pamela" - 3:33
Parody of "Panama" by Van Halen
A song about the evils of supermodels
"All I Wanna Do Is Shoot Some Guns" - 4:12
Parody of "All I Wanna Do" by Sheryl Crow
A song about Pulp Fiction
"88 Lines About 44 Simpsons" - 3:42
Parody of "88 Lines About 44 Women" by The Nails
A song about The Simpsons, each line about a different Simpsons character
"I Kissed A Squirrel" - 3:12
Parody of "I Kissed A Girl" by Jill Sobule
A song about the characters 'Birdseed Bobby' and 'Dusty' from "Ray TV", a show produced by Luke and his friends
"That Phat Track" - 0:54
Cover of "Kum By Ya" sung by the characters 'Birdseed Bobby and Dusty' from "Ray TV".
"Jackie Chan" - 1:49
Original song, by "Frozen Scream", about Jackie Chan.  Contains in-jokes from "Ray TV"
"Aliens Just Don't Understand" - 5:11
Parody of "Parents Just Don't Understand" by DJ Jazzy Jeff & The Fresh Prince
A song about the film Independence Day
"Ranma Saotome" - 3:36
Parody of "Kokomo" by the Beach Boys
A song about the anime series Ranma ½
Ranma's surname is mis-spelled as "Soutome" on the track listing
"Silent Bob" - 1:49
Parody of "Silent Night"
A song about Jay and Silent Bob from the View Askew movies.
"Mr. K." - 2:03
Parody of "Yesterday" by The Beatles
A song about a man who served as school principal for Luke and his siblings
"Star Trek Case" - 2:52
Parody of "Basket Case" by Green Day
A song about an over-obsessed Trekkie
"Viva Las Nagus" - 2:25
Parody of "Viva Las Vegas" by Elvis Presley
A song about the Ferengi of Star Trek
"Thank Q" - 3:45
Parody of "Thank You" by Boyz II Men
A song about Q from Star Trek
"What's Up Spock (Humptified D-flo Remix)" - 5:23
Parody amalgam of "The Humpty Dance" by Digital Underground and "What's Up Doc? (Can We Rock)" by Fu-Schnickens with Shaquille O'Neal
A song about the first four live-action Star Trek TV shows
"John Carridine" - 1:17
A sound bite from the character 'John Carridine' on "Ray TV".
"Lost In America" - 1:34
Original song, by "Frozen Scream", about being lost in America.  Contains in-jokes from "Ray TV"

1997 albums
Luke Ski albums